Charles Frederick Daft (8 June 1830 – 9 March 1915) was an English cricketer. His brother Richard and nephews Richard and Harry were also cricketers.

References

1830 births
1915 deaths
English cricketers
Nottinghamshire cricketers
All-England Eleven cricketers
North v South cricketers